Pierre Antoine A. Devaux (24 November 1897 – 11 January 1984) was a Belgian long-distance runner. He competed in the men's 10,000 metres at the 1920 Summer Olympics.

References

1897 births
1984 deaths
Athletes (track and field) at the 1920 Summer Olympics
Belgian male long-distance runners
Olympic athletes of Belgium
Place of birth missing